Marie Schölzel (born 1 August 1997) is a German volleyball player. She made her début in the national team in 2015, and since 2015 has been playing with Schweriner SC (nowadays SSC Palmberg Schwerin).

Career
In 2011, she became the German champion in the under-16 group, and in 2014, champion in the under-18 and under-20 group.

In 2015, Schölzel made her début in Germany women's national volleyball team in Montreux. In 2015, she started playing with Schweriner SC. In 2016/17, she reached the cup final with her team and became German champion. In 2018, she could not perform at the 2018 World Championship due to an injury. In the 2019/20 DVV-Pokal, the team reached the semi-finals. The season was cancelled due to COVID-19, however SSC Palmberg Schwerin was in first position. In 2021, her team won the DVV Pokal.

References

External links 
 FIVB profile
 Bundesliga profile
 

1997 births
Living people
German women's volleyball players
Volleyball players from Berlin